Lester L. Burry, OC (1898–1977) born Safe Harbour, Bonavista Bay, Newfoundland.

A United Church Minister

Lester Burry was baptized Methodist in 1898 and ordained a minister by the Newfoundland Conference of the Methodist Church in 1924.
The Newfoundland Conference of the Methodist Church entered into union with the United Church of Canada at the time of its inception in 1925, although the Dominion of Newfoundland did not enter into confederation with Canada until 1949

Politics

Burry was the National Convention Delegate for Labrador from 1946 to 1948. He was the first politician ever elected to represent Labrador. During the National Convention, he was one of a group of Delegates who advocated for Confederation with Canada.

In 1947, he joined the Ottawa Delegation, which visited Parliament Hill to negotiate the Terms of Union for Confederation with Canada. The delegations members (With their districts) were:     
 T.G.W. Ashbourne (Twillingate)
 F.G. Bradley (Bonavista South)
 Charles Ballam (Humber)
 Lester Burry (Labrador)
 P.W. Crummey (Bay de Verde)
 Joey Smallwood (Bonavista Centre)

Post-Confederation

From 1959 to 1960, Burry served as President of the Newfoundland Conference of the United Church.

See also
List of people of Newfoundland and Labrador

1898 births
1977 deaths
People from Newfoundland (island)
Dominion of Newfoundland people
Ministers of the United Church of Canada
Canadian Methodists
Newfoundland National Convention members
Officers of the Order of Canada